The twenty-second season of the American reality television series The Voice premiered September 19, 2022, on NBC. Blake Shelton and John Legend returned as coaches for their twenty-second and seventh seasons, respectively. Gwen Stefani, who last coached on season 19, returned as a coach for her sixth season. Camila Cabello made her first appearance as a coach this season. Meanwhile, Carson Daly returned as host for his twenty-second season.

The season finale was aired on December 13, 2022; Bryce Leatherwood was named as the winner of this season, marking Blake Shelton's ninth win as a coach. This was also the first instance in which a contestant who had been saved by a Wild Card Instant Save would go on to win the entire competition.

This season is also the first time without studio performances released on any platform.

Panelists

Coaches and host 

In May 2022, NBC announced that there would be a change in the show's roster of coaches. Of the four coaches that appeared on the previous season, only Blake Shelton and John Legend continue, with Shelton returning for his twenty-second season and Legend returning for his seventh. Kelly Clarkson and Ariana Grande both exited the panel, with Gwen Stefani returning for her sixth season and Camila Cabello returning for her second time on the show and joining as a first-time coach. Cabello previously served as the battle advisor for Team Legend in the previous season. Carson Daly returned for his twenty-second season as host.

Battle advisors 
The teams' battle advisors were revealed on August 17, 2022. The battle advisors for this season are Jazmine Sullivan for Team Legend, Sean Paul for Team Gwen, Charlie Puth for Team Camila, and Jimmie Allen for Team Blake.

Teams

Blind auditions 
The show began with the Blind Auditions on September 19, 2022. In each audition, an artist sings their piece in front of the coaches whose chairs are facing the audience. If a coach is interested to work with the artist, they will press their button to face the artist. If a singular coach presses the button, the artist automatically becomes part of their team. If multiple coaches turn, they will compete for the artist, who will decide which team they will join. Each coach has one "block" to prevent another coach from getting an artist. This season, each coach ends up with 14 artists by the end of the blind auditions, creating a total of 56 artists advancing to the battles.

Episode 1 (September 19)

Episode 2 (September 20)

Episode 3 (September 26)

Episode 4 (September 27)

Episode 5 (October 3)

Episode 6 (October 4)

Episode 7 (October 10)

The seventh episode included the last auditions as well as the first battle. The coaches performed Camila Cabello's "Havana" once all the teams were full.

Battles 
The battles aired on Monday, October 10, 2022, through Tuesday, October 25, 2022, comprising episodes 7 through 12. In this round, the coaches pit two of their artists in a singing match and then select one of them to advance to the next round. Losing artists may be "stolen" by another coach, becoming new members of their team, or can be saved by their coach, remaining a part of their original team. Multiple coaches can attempt to steal an artist, resulting in a competition for the artist, who will ultimately decide which team they will join. Additionally, their original coach can compete for their artist if they attempt to save them. At the end of this round, nine artists will remain on each team; seven will be the battle winners, and one from a steal and a save, respectively. In total, 36 artists advance to the knockouts. 

The guest advisors for this round were Jazmine Sullivan for Team Legend, Sean Paul for Team Gwen, Charlie Puth for Team Camila, and Jimmie Allen for Team Blake.

Knockouts 
The knockouts aired on October 31, 2022 through November 6, 2022, comprising episodes 13 to 15. In this round, each coach groups three of their artists in a singing match. The artists themselves will select the song they will sing in the round. The coach will then select one of the three artists to advance to the Live Playoffs. Each coach can steal one losing artist from another team, but the coaches do not have the ability to save their artists. At the end of this round, three artists will remain on each team while four artists will be stolen, creating a total of sixteen artists advancing to the Live Playoffs.

This was the first season since season 5 to not feature a mega mentor for the Knockouts. It is also the first season in the show's history to pit three artists against each other in a standard Knockout, though were a couple individual instances of three-way knockouts in previous seasons, such as in Team Pharrell in the eighth season and in Team Kelly in the fifteenth season, both being the result of an artist's withdrawal mid-season.

Live shows

Week 1: Top 16 – Playoffs (November 14–15) 
The Live Playoffs comprised episodes 16 and 17.  The Top 16 artists, four from each team, performed on Monday, November 14. This is the third time in the series' history, former two occasions in season 1 and season 4, in which only sixteen contestants competed in the Live Playoffs.

On Tuesday, November 15, two artists from each team were saved by getting the most overnight public votes per team. Each coach then selected one more artist from their team to advance, leaving four artists, one from each team, to compete for the Wild Card instant save.

Week 2: Top 13 (November 21–22) 
This week's theme was "Songs that Changed My Life". This season continued with the elimination format that returned in the previous season, in which not every coach is guaranteed an artist in the finale. The top nine artists were saved by the public's vote, while the remaining four artists, who received the fewest votes, competed for the Instant Save in the results show.  

Also, unlike last season, the artist's songs are not available for purchase on iTunes.

Week 3: Top 10 (November 28–29) 
This week's theme was "Fan Week" wherein the viewers selected the songs the ten artists performed. The top seven artists were saved by the public's vote, while the remaining three artists, who received the fewest votes, competed for the Instant Save in the results show.  

With Kim Cruse being instantly saved, this is the third time since season 16 that John Legend takes three contestants into the semi-final (first time in season 17, and second in season 19). With Kique being eliminated, Gwen Stefani and Camila Cabello both have only one artist left on their team, marking the first time since season 16 that two coaches take one artist each to the semi-final.

Week 4: Top 8 – Semifinals (December 5–6) 
The semifinals comprise episodes 22 and 23. The eight semifinalists each performed a solo song and a Whitney Houston duet with a fellow semifinalist on Monday, with the results following on Tuesday. The four artists with the most votes automatically moved on to the finale, while the remaining four artists competed in the Instant Save for the fifth and final spot in the finale.

With the elimination of Justin Aaron, this is Stefani's third time, in her six seasons as a coach, that she does not have an artist in the finale. With the advancement of Morgan Myles to the finale, Camila Cabello became the sixth new coach to successfully coach an artist on her team to the finale on her first attempt as a coach, after Usher (Michelle Chamuel in season 4), Alicia Keys (Wé McDonald in season 11), Kelly Clarkson (Brynn Cartelli in season 14), John Legend (Maelyn Jarmon in season 16), and Nick Jonas (Thunderstorm Artis in season 18).

Also, with the advancement of all three Team Blake members, this is the third time in the series history that a coach has three artists in the finals and the second time that Blake has three artists in the finale; the first was done by Team Adam in season 7 and the second was Team Blake in season 16. In addition, Bryce Leatherwood from Team Blake became the second Wild card Instant Save winner to make it to the finale, after Hailey Mia in season 21.

This is the first time in the show's history that a coach has three artists competing for the instant save.

Week 5: Finale (December 12–13) 
The Top 5 finalists performed two songs on Monday and a duet with their coach on Tuesday. This is the third consecutive season in which contestants cannot perform original songs on the finale.

With the victory of Bryce Leatherwood, he becomes the first Wild Card winner to win the entire competition. This also marks Blake's ninth overall win and the first time that a coach took 3 artists to the finale, and won the season. In addition, this was the third season to have the winner and runner-up from the same team, following seasons 3 (with Cassadee Pope and Terry McDermott) and 18 (with Todd Tilghman and Toneisha Harris). All three of these occurrences were done by Team Blake.

Elimination chart

Overall

Per team

Ratings

Controversy
On the semifinal results episode, all four white contestants advanced to the finale, while all of the people of color had to sing in the Instant Save to compete for the final spot. Some viewers were upset with this, and considered it to be racist.  Some viewers also speculated that the voting base voted for certain artists solely because they were on Team Blake. Additionally, after Omar Jose Cardona's Instant Save performance, John Legend, stunned by the results in which all three members of his team ended up in the bottom four, implied that the audience did not "vote for people because of their voice".

References

External links

2022 American television seasons
The Voice (American TV series)